Elroy is a masculine given name ("El Roi" is a Hebrew name ascribed to God, and means "God sees"; this was first mentioned in scripture in Genesis 16:13-14).  Bearers of the masculine name include:

People
 Elroy M. Avery (1844-1935), American politician
 Elroy Chester (1969-2013), American serial killer
 Elroy Gelant (born 1986), South African long-distance runner
 Elroy Harris (born 1966), American football running back
 Elroy Hirsch (1923–2004), American Hall-of-Fame football player, sport executive and actor
 Elroy van der Hooft (born 1990), German-born Dutch footballer
 Elroy Josephs (1939-1997), Jamaican dancer
 Elroy Kahanek (1941-2014), American record industry official and songwriter
 Elroy Kromheer (born 1970), Dutch former footballer
 Elroy Kuylen (born 1983), Belizean footballer 
 Elroy Maule (1913-1984), American politician 
 Elroy McBride (born 1993), Bahamian sprinter 
 Elroy Pappot (born 1993), Dutch footballer
 Elroy Powell (born 1973), better known by his stage name Spoonface, British singer, songwriter and producer
 Elroy Schwartz (1923–2013), American comedy and television writer
 Elroy Smith (born 1981), Belizean footballer
 Elroy Turner (born 1951), Antigua and Barbuda sprinter

Fictional characters
 Elroy Jetson, on the American animated TV series The Jetsons

See also

 Elroy (disambiguation)

Masculine given names